William, Bill, or Billy Walters may refer to:

 William Walters (outlaw) (1869–1921), also known as "Bronco Bill", outlaw during the closing days of the Old West
 William Melmoth Walters (1835–1925), President of the Incorporated Law Society
 William Thompson Walters (1820–1894), American businessman and art collector
 William Walters (priest), Archdeacon of Worcester, 1889–1911
 Willie Walters (1907–1994), South African athlete
 William Walters (MP) for Salisbury
 William Walters (baseball), see Pennsylvania Sports Hall of Fame
 Billy Walters (gambler) (born 1946), American professional gambler and insider trader
 Billy Walters (photographer), see Daily Bugle
 Billy Walters (rugby league) (born 1994), Australian
 Bill Walters (Arkansas politician) (1943–2013), American politician
 Bill Walters (baseball), see Midwest League
 Bill Walters (musician) in Blue Stone

See also

 William Waters (disambiguation)
 William Walter (disambiguation)